Pamela Joyce Piercy (born 1937), is a female former athlete who competed for England.

Athletics career
Piercy was selected by England to represent her country in athletics events. She finished just outside of the medals in fourth place, in the 1966 European Athletics Championships – Women's 800 metres in Budapest, Hungary.

She represented England in the 440 and 880 yards, at the 1966 British Empire and Commonwealth Games in Kingston, Jamaica.

She was a coach for Hull Achilles Athletics Club.

References

1937 births
English female middle-distance runners
Athletes (track and field) at the 1966 British Empire and Commonwealth Games
Living people
Commonwealth Games competitors for England